"Careful" is Guster's second single released from the Keep it Together album. It is also on the live CD and DVD Guster on Ice. 

Brian Rosenworcel provides backing vocals during the "na na na nas" on "Careful". This is only the second time he has been credited with vocals.

References 

Guster songs
2003 singles
2003 songs
Song recordings produced by Ron Aniello
Reprise Records singles